These are the official results of the Women's 1500 metres event at the 1986 European Championships in Stuttgart, West Germany, held at Neckarstadion on 29 and 31 August 1986.

Medalists

Final

Qualifying heats

Participation
According to an unofficial count, 20 athletes from 14 countries participated in the event.

 (1)
 (1)
 (1)
 (1)
 (1)
 (1)
 (1)
 (1)
 (3)
 (3)
 (1)
 (3)
 (1)
 (1)

See also
 1982 Women's European Championships 1500 metres (Athens)
 1983 Women's World Championships 1500 metres (Helsinki)
 1984 Women's Olympic 1500 metres (Los Angeles)
 1987 Women's World Championships 1500 metres (Rome)
 1988 Women's Olympic 1500 metres (Seoul)
 1990 Women's European Championships 1500 metres (Split)

References

 Results

1500
1500 metres at the European Athletics Championships
1986 in women's athletics